St Patrick's College is a Catholic systemic co-educational secondary day school, located in Gympie, Queensland, Australia. St Patrick's College is a parish-based Catholic College catering for Years 7 to 12. In 2020, just over 470 students are enrolled at the college.

History
The college has provided Catholic education for the Gympie district for over 100 years. Christian Brothers' College for Boys was established in 1904 by the Christian Brothers and the Sisters of Mercy established Sisters of Mercy High School for Girls in 1916. Those colleges were combined in 1983 to form St Patrick's College, which is located on the old Christian Brothers' College site.

See also 
 Lists of schools in Queensland

References

External links 

Educational institutions established in 1904
Private schools in Queensland
Catholic secondary schools in Queensland
1904 establishments in Australia
Former Congregation of Christian Brothers schools in Australia
Schools in Wide Bay–Burnett